Galium californicum is a species of flowering plant in the coffee family known by the common name California bedstraw.

The plant is endemic to California. It grows mainly in moist, shady habitats in hills and mountainous areas, often within the California chaparral and woodlands ecoregion.

Description
Galium californicum is a variable plant in the form of a small perennial herb to a sprawling woody-based shrub approaching  in height. Its stems and small oval-shaped leaves are hairy.

The plant is dioecious with male plants producing small clusters of staminate flowers and female plants producing solitary flowers. Both types of flower are generally dull yellow. The fruit is a berry covered in soft hairs.

Subspecies
Seven subspecies of Galium californicum, all endemic to California, are currently recognized:

Galium californicum subsp. californicum — California bedstraw — endemic to the Santa Lucia Mountains of the Outer South California Coast Ranges.
Galium californicum subsp. flaccidum — endemic to the Santa Lucia Mountains of the Outer South California Coast Ranges, Outer and Inner North California Coast Ranges, and San Francisco Bay Area.
Galium californicum subsp. luciense — Cone Peak bedstraw  —  endemic to the Santa Lucia Mountains, on the Central Coast of California; CNPS rare species.
Galium californicum subsp. maritimum — Coastal California bedstraw  —  endemic to Outer South California Coast Ranges, San Francisco Peninsula to Southern California.
Galium californicum subsp. miguelense — San Miguel Island bedstraw  —  endemic to San Miguel Island of the northern Channel Islands, Southern California; CNPS rare species.
Galium californicum subsp. primum — endemic to the San Jacinto Mountains and Chino Hills, Riverside County, California; State threatened species.
Galium californicum subsp. sierrae — El Dorado bedstraw  — endemic to the Sierra Nevada foothills in El Dorado County; State rare species, federal endangered species.

Conservation
One of the subspecies of the plant, the El Dorado bedstraw (Galium californicum subsp. sierrae) is CNPS−California Native Plant Society and State of California listed Rare plant species, and a federally listed Endangered species of the United States. It grows in the gabbro soils of the Pine Hill Ecological Reserve and surrounding area in the interior chaparral and woodlands of the Sierra Nevada foothills in El Dorado County, eastern California. It differs from Galium californicum ssp. californicum by its narrower leaves.

See also
California chaparral and woodlands
 — flora.

References

External links
CalFlora Database: Galium californicum (California bedstraw)
Jepson Manual Treatment — Galium californicum
USDA Plants Profile for Galium californicum (California bedstraw)
The Nature Conservancy: Galium californicum conservation
Galium californicum — UC Photos gallery

californicum
Endemic flora of California
Flora of the Sierra Nevada (United States)
Natural history of the California chaparral and woodlands
Natural history of the California Coast Ranges
Natural history of the Peninsular Ranges
Natural history of the San Francisco Bay Area
Natural history of the Transverse Ranges
Natural history of the Channel Islands of California
Natural history of El Dorado County, California
Plants described in 1839
Dioecious plants